The East Asian Monsoon is a monsoonal flow that carries moist air from the Indian Ocean and Pacific Ocean to East Asia. It affects approximately one-third of the global population, influencing the climate of Japan, the Korean Peninsula, Taiwan, China, the Philippines and Mainland Southeast Asia but most significantly Vietnam. It is driven by temperature differences between the East Asian continent and the Pacific Ocean. The East Asian monsoon is divided into a warm and wet summer monsoon and a cold and dry winter monsoon. This cold and dry winter monsoon is responsible for the aeolian dust deposition and pedogenesis that resulted in the creation of the Loess Plateau. The monsoon influences weather patterns as far north as Siberia, causing wet summers that contrast with the cold and dry winters caused by the Siberian High, which counterbalances the monsoon's effect on northerly latitudes.

In most years, the monsoonal flow shifts in a very predictable pattern, with winds being southeasterly in late June, bringing significant rainfall to the region, resulting in the East Asian rainy season as the monsoon boundary advances northward during the spring and summer. This leads to a reliable precipitation spike in July and August. However, this pattern occasionally fails, leading to drought and crop failure. In the winter, the winds are northeasterly and the monsoonal precipitation bands move back to the south, and intense precipitation occurs over southern China and Taiwan.

Over Japan and Korea, the monsoon boundary typically takes the form of a quasi-stationary front separating the cooler air mass associated with the Okhotsk High to the north from the hot, humid air mass associated with the subtropical ridge to the south. The spring-summer rainy season is referred to as "plum rain" in various languages of East Asia. The East Asian monsoon is known as meiyu in China and Taiwan, and jangma (장마) in Korea.

The location and strength of the East Asian monsoon has varied during the Holocene which scientists track using pollen and dust.

See also 
 East Asian rainy season
 List of China-related topics
 List of Japan-related topics

References

Sources

External links 
 East Asian monsoon profile
 East Asian Monsoon (book)
 Paper on the 1994 monsoonal failure
 Profile of South Korean climate
 East Asian Monsoon Experiment

Environment of East Asia
Precipitation
Winds
Climate of China
Climate of Taiwan
Climate of North Korea
Climate of South Korea
Climate of Japan